Mohammad Sharifi (born 10 December 1978) is a Saudi Arabian former football who played as a goalkeeper.

Club career
Sharifi was in Al-Nasr's squad for the 2000 FIFA Club World Championship.

International career
Sharifi made one appearance with the senior Saudi Arabia national football team during the 2006 FIFA World Cup qualifying rounds.

References

External links
 

1978 births
Living people
Sportspeople from Riyadh
Saudi Arabian footballers
Saudi Arabia international footballers
Al Nassr FC players
Al-Fateh SC players
Ettifaq FC players
Najran SC players
Al-Nahda Club (Saudi Arabia) players
Al-Wehda Club (Mecca) players
Al-Raed FC players
Saudi First Division League players
Saudi Professional League players
Association football goalkeepers